Trent is an unincorporated community in Wolfe County, Kentucky, United States.  It lies along Route 191 northeast of the city of Campton, the county seat of Wolfe County.  Its elevation is 1,030 feet (314 m).

References

Unincorporated communities in Wolfe County, Kentucky
Unincorporated communities in Kentucky